Cannabitriol ((+)-CBT, (S,S)-9,10-Dihydroxy-Δ6a(10a)-THC) is a phytocannabinoid first isolated in 1966, an oxidation product of tetrahydrocannabinol which has been identified both as a trace component of cannabis and as a metabolite in cannabis users. Its pharmacology has been little studied, though it has been found to act as an antiestrogen and aromatase inhibitor.

See also
 8,11-Dihydroxy-THC
 9-OH-HHC
 Cannabicitran (also sometimes called CBT)
 Delta-3-THC

References

External links
CBD Oil & Capsules

Cannabinoids
Benzochromenes
Phenols